The following low-power television stations broadcast on digital or analog channel 6 in the United States:

 K06AA-D in Broadus, Montana
 K06AE-D in Prescott, Arizona
 K06AV-D in Wolf Point, Montana
 K06DM-D in Panaca, Nevada
 K06FE-D in Miles City, Montana
 K06GW-D in New Castle, Colorado
 K06HN-D in Gunnison, Colorado
 K06HT-D in Ely, Nevada
 K06HU-D in Aspen, Colorado
 K06HZ-D in Paonia, Colorado
 K06IQ-D in Newberry Springs, California
 K06JA-D in Cedar Canyon, Utah
 K06JC-D in Chadron, Nebraska
 K06KA-D in Fort Jones, etc., California
 K06KQ-D in Manhattan, Nevada
 K06KR-D in Crawford, Nebraska
 K06MK-D in Elko, Nevada
 K06NS-D in Chiloquin, Oregon
 K06NT-D in Dolores, Colorado
 K06NV-D in White Sulphur Springs, Montana
 K06NY-D in Ryndon, Nevada
 K06PG-D in Laughlin, Nevada
 K06PT-D in Columbia, Missouri
 K06PU-D in Yakima, Washington
 K06QA-D in Odessa, Texas
 K06QD-D in Pasco, Washington
 K06QF-D in Heron, Montana
 K06QI-D in Alamogordo, New Mexico
 K06QJ-D in Sioux Falls, South Dakota
 K06QL-D in Modesto, California
 K06QN-D in Judith Gap, Montana
 K06QP-D in Juneau, Alaska
 K06QR-D in Eugene, Oregon
 K06QS-D in Salina & Redmond, Utah
 K06QW-D in Sentinel, Arizona
 K06QX-D in Reno, Nevada
 K12RF-D in Healy, etc., Alaska
 KBFW-LD in Arlington, Texas
 KBKF-LD in San Jose, California, an ATSC 3.0 station
 KCIO-LP in Victorville, California
 KCVH-LD in Houston, Texas
 KEFM-LD in Sacramento, California, an ATSC 3.0 station
 KFMY-LD in Petaluma, California
 KGHD-LP in Las Vegas, Nevada
 KIPS-LD in Beaumont, Texas
 KJDN-LD in Logan, Utah
 KMCF-LD in Visalia, California
 KNIK-LP in Anchorage, Alaska
 KNXT-LD in Bakersfield, California
 KPWC-LD in Tillamook, Oregon
 KRPE-LD in San Diego, California
 KTVJ-LD in Nampa, Idaho
 KWFT-LD in Fort Smith, Arkansas
 KXDP-LD in Denver, Colorado, an ATSC 3.0 station
 KXKW-LP in Lafayette, Louisiana
 KYMU-LD in Seattle, Washington
 KZFW-LD in Dallas, Texas
 KZNO-LD in Big Bear Lake, California, an ATSC 3.0 station
 W06AJ-D in Franklin, etc., North Carolina
 W06DA-D in Aguada, Puerto Rico
 W06DI-D in Jasper, Florida
 W06DK-D in Florence, South Carolina
 WATV-LD in Orlando, Florida
 WDCN-LD in Fairfax, Virginia, an ATSC 3.0 station
 WDDA-LP in Dalton, Georgia
 WDHC-LD in Lebanon, Kentucky
 WDMY-LD in Toledo, Ohio
 WEYS-LD in Miami, Florida, an ATSC 3.0 station
 WFIB-LD in Key West, Florida
 WHDY-LP in Panama City, Florida
 WJMF-LD in Jackson, Mississippi
 WMTO-LD in Norfolk, Virginia, an ATSC 3.0 station
 WNDR-LP in Auburn, New York
 WNYZ-LP in New York, New York
 WPGF-LP in Memphis, Tennessee
 WRME-LD in Chicago, Illinois, an ATSC 3.0 station
 WTBS-LD in Atlanta, Georgia, an ATSC 3.0 station
 WVCC-LD in Westmoreland, New Hampshire
 WVOA-LD in Westvale, New York
 WWXY-LD in San Juan, Puerto Rico

The following low-power stations, which are no longer licensed, formerly broadcast on digital or analog channel 6:
 K06BI in Manitou Springs, Colorado
 K06BN in Wagon Mound, New Mexico
 K06BQ in Richfield, etc., Utah
 K06BS in Loa, etc., Utah
 K06CT in Orovada, Nevada
 K06DR in Spring Glen, etc., Utah
 K06EB in Brusett, etc., Montana
 K06EX in Lewiston, California
 K06EY in Broken Bow, Nebraska
 K06FA in Hopland, California
 K06FD in La Barge, etc., Wyoming
 K06FL in Fish Lake Resort, Utah
 K06FM in Long Valley Junction, Utah
 K06FT in Penasco, New Mexico
 K06HF in Salida, etc., Colorado
 K06HX in Mora, New Mexico
 K06IG in Koosharem, Utah
 K06IM in Henefer, etc., Utah
 K06IO in Scottsburg, Oregon
 K06JF in Cortez, Colorado
 K06JK in Dayton, Nevada
 K06JH in Wanship, Utah
 K06JM in Gillette, Wyoming
 K06JN in Severance Ranch, etc., Oregon
 K06JU in Howard, Montana
 K06JX in Manley Hot Springs, Alaska
 K06KC in Yerington, Nevada
 K06KJ in Collbran, Colorado
 K06KO-D in Kanarraville, etc., Utah
 K06LG-D in Chuathbaluk, Alaska
 K06LI in Chemult, Oregon
 K06LK in Clarks Point, etc., Alaska
 K06LP in Circle Hot Springs, Alaska
 K06LX in Glenwood Springs, Colorado
 K06MF in Kenai, etc., Alaska
 K06MM in Bluff, Utah
 K06NG-D in Sargents, Colorado
 K06NI in The Dalles, Oregon
 K06NK in Mexican Hat, Utah
 K06NZ in Gabbs, Nevada
 K06OV in Peoa and Oakley, Utah
 K06OY in Baker Flats, etc., Washington
 K06QG-D in Sioux City, Iowa
 K06QO-D in Martinsdale, Montana
 KBEX-LP in Amarillo, Texas
 KBOP-LD in Dallas, Texas
 KESU-LP in Hanamaulu, Hawaii
 KFLZ-LD in San Antonio, Texas
 KFMP-LP in Lubbock, Texas
 KJIV-LP in Lake City, etc., California
 KLOA-LP in Inyokern, etc., California
 KNNN-LP in Redding, California
 KPOM-LP in Indio, California
 KRGT-LP in Rio Grande City, Texas
 KSHW-LP in Sheridan, Wyoming
 KUHD-LD in Camarillo, California
 W06AD in Spruce Pine, North Carolina
 W06AE in Clayton, etc., Georgia
 W06AL in Oteen, etc., North Carolina
 W06AP in Maggie Valley, etc., North Carolina
 W06AQ in Bat Cave, etc., North Carolina
 W06BD in Princeton, Indiana
 W06BH in Phenix City, etc., Alabama
 WBPA-LD in Weirton, West Virginia
 WMYH-LP in Elmira, New York
 WRTN-LP in Alexandria, Tennessee
 WXXW-LP in Binghamton, New York

Potential full shutdown 
The FCC required all analog (NTSC) transmissions on Channel 6 to cease by July 13, 2021.

References

06 low-power